CNN Philippines Kapampangan News was the flagship Kapampangan-language newscast of CNN Philippines. It aired weekdays at 1:15 p.m.  (PST) after Cebuano News. It was the second regional newscast produced by CNN Philippines, premiering under its predecessor Solar News Channel and the first national newscast in Kapampangan.

Background

Premiere
Following Cebuano News, Kapampangan News was another innovative program by Solar News Channel to deliver its trademark newsgathering in Kapampangan language, the 6th widely spoken language in the Philippines and one of the most widely spoken in Luzon. Kapampangan News was launched on August 4, 2014, with its graphics and title card updated 20 days later (August 24) following channel's rebrand to 9TV. The current incarnation was launched on March 16, 2015 in lieu with the launch of CNN Philippines along with a CNN-themed graphics and a revamped news studio.

Revamp and cancellation
On February 15, 2016, Cebuano News and Kapampangan News reduced their timeslot from their half-hour running time to 15 minutes until the network quietly axed the newscast on March 31, 2017.

Along with Cebuano News and the 1:30 pm filler slot, Kapampangan News was replaced on April 3, 2017 by the simulcast of the 1 AM EDT hour of CNN Newsroom with Cyril Vanier and Natalie Allen (Monday) and John Vause and Isha Sesay (Tuesday to Friday) as a part of Armie Jarin-Bennett's continuing revamps on the network.

Staff
Final Anchor
Nicolette Henson-Hizon

Substitute anchor(s)
Jayvee Dizon
Nevi Calma

Stringers
Justin Dizon
Jaypee Bugayon
Amir Medina
Joelyn Baluyut

See also
Nine Media Corporation
CNN Philippines

References

2014 Philippine television series debuts
2017 Philippine television series endings
CNN Philippines original programming